Arncliffe was an electoral district of the Legislative Assembly in the Australian state of New South Wales, created in 1930, partly replacing St George, and named after and including the Sydney suburb of Arncliffe. It was abolished in 1941 and partly replaced by Cook's River.

Members for Arncliffe

See also
 Electoral results for the district of Arncliffe

References

Former electoral districts of New South Wales
Constituencies established in 1930
Constituencies disestablished in 1941
1930 establishments in Australia
1941 disestablishments in Australia